A sport coat, also called a sport jacket (or sports coat or sports jacket in American English), is a men's smart casual lounge jacket designed to be worn on its own without matching trousers, traditionally for sporting purposes. Styles, fabrics, colours and patterns are more varied than in most suits; sturdier and thicker fabrics are commonly used, such as corduroy, suede, denim, leather, and tweed.

Originally, sports coats were worn as appropriate attire for participating in certain outdoor sports. With time, they were adopted by those attending such events, and came to be used on more formal occasions, sometimes being used in school uniforms.

Types 
A shooting jacket is a type of sport coat worn, as the name suggests, originally while participating in the sports of shooting or hunting. It usually comes with a leather patch on the front shoulder to prevent recoil wear from the butt of a shotgun or rifle, and frequently has matching leather patches on the elbows.

A hacking jacket is a wool sports coat for casual horseback riding, often of tweed and traditionally 3 buttoned with a single vent.

A blazer is similar to a sports coat, typically tailored from solid color or striped fabrics.  Blazers are often made with metal buttons reflecting their origins in the British Navy and the sport of boating, though this is not necessarily a defining feature. Blazers also often have patch pockets, unlike other kinds of coats.

The jacket is mentioned in the title of the 1957 rock and roll hit single "A White Sport Coat (and a Pink Carnation)" by Marty Robbins; the title was later adapted by Jimmy Buffett for his 1973 album A White Sport Coat and a Pink Crustacean.

Fabric 
A sports coat or sports jacket comes in a variety of fabrics such as wool, tweed, linen, corduroy and cotton. The most classic style of a sports coat is made from wool, in particular tweed. In Ireland, Donegal tweed is famously made in the Irish County of Donegal and used for sports coats and jackets. There are several well-known manufactures such as the fifth-generation weaver Mulhern at Triona Design in the town of Ardara.

See also
Blouson
British Country Clothing
Norfolk jacket

References

External links

Esquire Magazine, How to Buy a Blazer, July 2009

Lounge jackets